is a subway station in the Tokyo Metro network. It is located in Bunkyo, Tokyo.  The station is the nearest station to Yayoi campus of the University of Tokyo.

Line 
  Tokyo Metro Namboku Line (station number N-12)

Station layout

Places near the station
University of Tokyo The first exit of this station is in the Yayoi campus of the university.
Bunkyo Gakuin University
Nippon Medical School's Sendagi campus
Saikyo-ji temple
Nezu Shrine

History
Todaimae Station opened on March 26, 1996.

The station facilities were inherited by Tokyo Metro after the privatization of the Teito Rapid Transit Authority (TRTA) in 2004.

References 

Railway stations in Tokyo
Tokyo Metro Namboku Line